WMBG (740 kHz) is a commercial AM radio station licensed in Williamsburg, Virginia, serving the Virginia Peninsula.  WMBG is owned and operated by Gregory H. Granger.  It airs local news and talk, as well as a mix of adult standards, oldies, and classic hits formats.

The station operates with 500 watts omnidirectional by day.  But because 740 is a clear-channel frequency reserved for Class A CFZM Toronto, WMBG must reduce power to 7 watts at night to avoid interference.

WMBG programming is simulcast full time on an FM translator station, W228DX, 93.5 Mc.

History
On November 14, 1959, the station first signed on as WBCI.  The station was owned by the Williamsburg Broadcasting Company.

References

External links
 WMBG AM-740 Online

MBG
Radio stations established in 1959
Adult standards radio stations in the United States
Oldies radio stations in the United States
Classic hits radio stations in the United States
1959 establishments in Virginia